Charles Vaillancourt (born September 18, 1992) is a former Canadian football offensive lineman. He was selected in the first round and fifth overall by the Lions in the 2016 CFL Draft and signed with the team on May 25, 2016. He played CIS football with the Laval Rouge et Or and won a Vanier Cup championship in 2012.

References

External links
 Canadian Football League profile
 BC Lions profile

1992 births
Living people
BC Lions players
Canadian football offensive linemen
Laval Rouge et Or football players
Players of Canadian football from Quebec